Democratic Change may refer to:

 Democratic Change (El Salvador)
 Democratic Change (Panama)
 Democratic Change (South Sudan)
 Movement for Democratic Change (pre-2005), a Zimbabwean political party that split in 2005
 Movement for Democratic Change – Tsvangirai, the larger current formation of the party
 Movement for Democratic Change – Mutambara, the smaller current formation of the party